San Ignacio de Zamucos or San Ignacio was a Jesuit mission in Santa Cruz Department, Bolivia that was founded in 1724 and abandoned in 1745. The inhabitants of the mission were the Zamucoan-speaking Ayoreo.

Location
The ruins of San Ignacio de Zamucos are located in the southeastern end of the Kaa-Iya del Gran Chaco National Park, near San Ignacio in Cordillera Province, Santa Cruz Department. It is located a few kilometers from the Bolivia-Paraguay border and Cerro San Miguel (or "Cerro de Irala").

History
In 1716, an initial attempt was made at establishing a mission, but the mission was not actually established until 1724. 

In 1724, San Ignacio de Zamucos was founded in indigenous Ayoreo ("zamucos ugaraños") territory by the Jesuit missionary Agustín Castañares and the friar Ignacio Chomé, as well as Felipe Suárez and Juan Bautista Zea. However, when Castañares died and the mission was attacked, it was abandoned in 1745. Most of the mission's inhabitants then went on to form part of the population of San Ignacio de Velasco.

See also
 List of Jesuit sites
 List of the Jesuit Missions of Chiquitos

References

Jesuit Missions of Chiquitos
Spanish missions in Bolivia
Former populated places in Bolivia
Buildings and structures in Santa Cruz Department (Bolivia)
18th-century religious buildings and structures
18th century in the Viceroyalty of Peru
Indigenous topics of the Gran Chaco